Schefflera gleasonii, the yuquilla, is a species of plant in the family Araliaceae. It is endemic to Puerto Rico. It is found in ultramafic soils in the central Punta range of Puerto Rico. It is a montane forest tree.

References

gleasonii
Endemic flora of Puerto Rico
Vulnerable plants
Taxonomy articles created by Polbot